Black Warrior Brewing Company is a craft brewery in Tuscaloosa, Alabama.

History 
Founders Joe Fuller, Jason Spikes and Eric Hull were friends and home-brewing enthusiasts who also worked together before they decided to open the brewery. They named the company after the Black Warrior River that runs through Tuscaloosa County. Black Warrior was the second brewery to open in Tuscaloosa after Tuscaloosa's city council voted to change the city’s zoning ordinances in 2012 to allow breweries and brewpubs.

The previous tenant of the brewery's two-story commercial storefront in the Downtown Tuscaloosa Historic District was the Oak City Barber & Beauty Shop, historically Black-owned business.

Beers 
 Apricot Wheat (4.6% ABV)
 Blonde Ale (5.1% ABV)
 Broad Street Brown Ale (5.4% ABV)
 Lock 17 IPA (6.2% ABV)
 Crimson Ale (5.2% ABV)
 Belgian Red Rye (6.8% ABV)*
 Additional Weekly New Small-Batch Brews

Community 
Black Warrior Brewing has given back to the community in a variety of ways. Once a month they host a charity night, titled "Pints with a Purpose" which donates a percentage of sales back to a different local charity every month.  For example, in March 2014, the brewery hosted Ales to Fight Hunger, a fundraiser for a charity that provides weekend food to hungry schoolchildren in Alabama. The company also sponsors Tuscaloosa GoKickBall.

Notes

External links 
 Black Warrior Brewing Company website
 Alabama Brewers Guild | Members

American beer brands
Beer brewing companies based in Alabama
2012 establishments in Alabama
Companies based in Tuscaloosa, Alabama